Earnshill House in Hambridge, near Curry Rivel, Somerset, England is a manor house, set in parkland. It was built in 1725 for Henry Combe, a Bristol merchant by John Strachan. It has been designated as a Grade I listed building.

History

The manor of Earnshill was owned by Muchelney Abbey until the dissolution of the monasteries and then became the property of the Jennings family. In 1720 it was bought by the Bristol merchant Henry Combe who was a member of the Society of Merchant Venturers and later mayor of the city. It was then passed on through his family, via his son Richard Combe (MP).

During World War II the house was used for children evacuated from Durlston Court School in Hampshire.

Architecture

The entrance is of five bays with projecting wings on either side. The house is built of brick with Hamstone dressings in a Palladian style.

The outside of the house includes a walled garden as part of a wider area of parkland, with substantial gatepiers at the entrance to the drive. There was also an attached farm with a brick barn. In the surrounding woodland was a four-pipe duck decoy with nine shooting positions.

See also

 List of Grade I listed buildings in South Somerset

References

Houses completed in 1725
Grade I listed buildings in South Somerset
Grade I listed houses in Somerset
1725 establishments in Great Britain